Castellarano is a comune (municipality) in the Province of Reggio Emilia in the Italian region Emilia-Romagna, located about  west of Bologna and about  southeast of Reggio Emilia. 

Castellarano borders the following municipalities: Baiso, Casalgrande, Prignano sulla Secchia, Sassuolo, Scandiano, Viano.

References

External links
 Official website

Cities and towns in Emilia-Romagna